"Condemnation" is a song by English electronic music band Depeche Mode, released on 13 September 1993 as the third single from their eighth studio album, Songs of Faith and Devotion (1993). The song reached  9 on the UK Singles Chart, No. 3 in Sweden, and No. 1 in Portugal. Its music video was directed by Anton Corbijn.

The B-sides are remixes of "Death's Door" and "Rush", and some live tracks from the Devotional Tour. "Death's Door" was a song from the 1991 Until the End of the World soundtrack. The original version, recorded by Martin Gore and Alan Wilder after the World Violation Tour was over, was exclusive to that album until the 2020s MODE box compilation.

Critical reception
In his weekly UK chart commentary, James Masterton described the song as "a haunting, beautiful ballad of the type they do so well". Alan Jones from Music Week gave it four out of five, writing, "One of the more atypical singles in Depeche Mode's career, this slow gospel-style song bears a lusty, full force vocal, but a reverential and reserved instrumental track. Subtle and stylish." Sam Wood from Philadelphia Inquirer noted that "Depeche Mode appropriates gospel harmonies and the rhythms of Southern slave chants for "Condemnation", a song that defies the judgment of some unnamed Philistine accuser". Tom Doyle from Smash Hits also gave the song four out of five, adding, "You always expect the strangest things to happen in the world of pop, but Depeche Mode going gospel?! The Bizarre thing is, it really works too. Dave Gahan is joined by a gospel choir and the result is quite the best thing since, well, the last Depeche Mode single. Life is weird."

Music video
A music video was produced to promote the single, directed by Dutch photographer, film director and music video director Anton Corbijn. It was published on YouTube in July 2019.

For unknown reasons, the music video did not appear on Depeche Mode's music video compilation, The Videos 86-98, in 1998, replaced by the live version from Devotional. The original video eventually resurfaced on The Videos 86-98's 2002 re-release (The Videos 86-98+). Both videos appear on the Devotional DVD re-release in 2004 (although the "Condemnation Live" video was edited so that it wasn't identical to the one in the main Devotional movie).

Track listings

 7-inch, cassette: Mute / Bong23, CBong23 – UK
 "Condemnation (Paris Mix)" – 3:21 (remix by Alan Wilder & Steve Lyon)
 "Death's Door (Jazz Mix)" – 6:38 (remix by Depeche Mode & Steve Lyon)
 7-inch released as a promo only, not commercially released, hence why both songs appear on the 12-inch version.

 12-inch: Mute / 12Bong23 – UK
 "Condemnation (Paris Mix)" – 3:21
 "Death's Door (Jazz Mix)" – 6:38
 "Rush (Spiritual Guidance Mix)" – 5:31 (remix by Jack Dangers)
 "Rush (Amylnitrate Mix – Instrumental)" – 7:43 (remix by Tony Garcia and Guido Osorio)
 "Rush (Wild Planet Mix – Vocal)" – 6:23 (remix by Tony Garcia and Guido Osorio)

 12-inch: Mute / L12Bong23 – UK
 "Condemnation (Live)" – 4:10
 "Personal Jesus (Live)" – 6:00
 "Enjoy the Silence (Live)" – 6:46
 "Halo (Live)" – 4:54

 CD: Mute / CDBong23 – UK
 "Condemnation (Paris Mix)" – 3:21
 "Death's Door (Jazz Mix)" – 6:38
 "Rush (Spiritual Guidance Mix)" – 5:31 (remix by Jack Dangers)
 "Rush (Amylnitrate Mix – Instrumental)" – 7:43 (remix by Tony Garcia and Guido Osorio)

 CD: Mute / LCDBong23 – UK
 "Condemnation (Live)" – 4:10
 "Personal Jesus (Live)" – 6:00
 "Enjoy the Silence (Live)" – 6:46
 "Halo (Live)" – 4:54

 CD: Mute / CDBong23X – EU
 "Condemnation (Paris Mix)" – 3:21
 "Death's Door (Jazz Mix)" – 6:38
 "Rush (Spiritual Guidance Mix)" – 5:31
 "Rush (Amylnitrate Mix – Instrumental)" – 7:43
 "Rush (Wild Planet Mix – Vocal)" – 6:23
 "Condemnation (Live)" – 4:10
 "Personal Jesus (Live)" – 6:00
 "Enjoy the Silence (Live)" – 6:46
 "Halo (Live)" – 4:54
 This CD is the 2004 re-release

 Promo 12-inch: Mute / P12Bong23 (UK)
 "Condemnation (Paris Mix )" - 3:22
 "Death's Door (Jazz Mix Mix)" - 6:38
 "Rush (Spiritual Guidance Mix)" - 5:31

 Promo 12-inch: Mute / PL12Bong23R (UK)
 "Rush (Spiritual Guidance Mix)" - 5:31
 "Rush (Amylnitrate Mix (Instrumental))" - 7:41
 "Rush (Wild Planet Mix (Vocal))" - 6:23

 12-inch: Sire/Reprise / 9 41058-0 – US
 "Condemnation (Live)" – 4:10
 "Enjoy the Silence (Live)" – 6:46
 "Halo (Live)" – 4:54
 "Death's Door (Jazz Mix)" – 6:38
 "Rush (Spiritual Guidance Mix)" – 5:31
 "Rush (Nitrate Mix)" – 7:43
 "Rush (Wild Planet Mix – Vocal)" – 6:23
 "Condemnation (Paris Mix)" – 3:21

 CD: Sire/Reprise / 9 41058-2 – US
 "Condemnation (Paris Mix)" – 3:21
 "Rush (Spiritual Guidance Mix)" – 5:31
 "Death's Door (Jazz Mix)" – 6:38
 "Rush (Nitrate Mix)" – 7:43
 "Enjoy the Silence (Live)" – 6:46
 "Halo (Live)" – 4:54
 "Condemnation (Live)" – 4:10

 The "Nitrate Mix" of "Rush" and the "Amylnitrate Mix – Instrumental" of "Rush" are the same.
 All live songs were recorded in Milan, Italy, in 1993.
 All songs written by Martin Gore.

Charts

References

External links
 Single information from the official Depeche Mode web site
 Allmusic review 

1993 singles
1993 songs
Depeche Mode songs
Music videos directed by Anton Corbijn
Mute Records singles
Number-one singles in Portugal
Song recordings produced by Flood (producer)
Songs written by Martin Gore
Gospel songs